The 2018 Western Illinois Leathernecks football team represented Western Illinois University in the 2018 NCAA Division I FCS football season. They were led by first-year head coach Jared Elliott and played their home games at Hanson Field. They were a member of the Missouri Valley Football Conference (MVFC). They finished the season 5–6, 4–4 in MVFC play to finish in fifth place.

Previous season
The Leathernecks finished the 2017 season 8–4, 5–3 in MVFC play to finish in fourth place. They received an at-large bid to the FCS Playoffs where they lost to Weber State in the first round.

On December 22, head coach Charlie Fisher resigned to become the wide receivers coach at Arizona State. He finished at Western Illinois with a two-year record of 14–9.

Preseason

Award watch lists

Preseason MVFC poll
The MVFC released their preseason poll on July 29, 2018, with the Leathernecks predicted to finish in seventh place.

Preseason All-MVFC Teams
The Leathernecks placed five at six positions players on the preseason all-MVFC teams.

Offense

2nd team

Sean McGuire – QB

Steve McShane – RB

Defense

1st team

Khalen Saunders – DL

Justin Fitzpatrick – DB

Steve McShane – RS

2nd team

Quentin Moon – DB

Schedule

Source: Schedule

Game summaries

at Montana State

at Illinois

Montana

Youngstown State

at Illinois State

North Dakota State

at Missouri State

Northern Iowa

at Southern Illinois

at South Dakota

Indiana State

Players drafted into the NFL

References

Western Illinois
Western Illinois Leathernecks football seasons
Western Illinois Leathernecks football